A mountain sport or Alpine sport is one of several types of sport that take place in hilly or mountainous terrain.

All these sports require special equipment, carry a higher level of risk and require specialised training before they can be undertaken safely.

Because mountain sportsmen deliberately go into terrain that is not easily accessible where there are higher risks – dangers such as avalanches, bad weather, mudflows, rockfalls and icefalls - special measures must be taken to mitigate these risks. This is generally known as risk management.
Mountain sports include the following:
Mountaineering
Climbing
Klettersteig or via ferrata climbing
Ski touring, ski mountaineering and its freeriding
Snowshoeing
Hiking, especially Hillwalking
Mountain biking (partly)
Trekking
Canyoning

The usual skiing on pistes is not generally counted as a mountain sport, because the use of prepared slopes and the corresponding legal standards reduce risks to a minimum, so that the skier or snowboarder does not have to take account of any significant risks.

Mountain sport tourism 
Many mountain schools offer the various mountain sports as guided tours. These enable beginners to try out the various activities under supervision. The leaders of these tours know the likely risks on their tour routes and accompany the party. Some of these tours are targeted at specific groups, such as guided Alpine crossings for beginners, intermediates, older people or singles.

These tours have adapted to the changes in travel behaviour of tourists observed in recent years. For example, studies by the University of Berne have found that travellers expect increasingly individualized and flexible travel deals. They are mainly looking for deals that provide varied and intense experiences.

Mountain sports and conservation 
Because mountain sports usually take place in area of relatively unspoilt nature, it is important that participants ensure their activities are carried out in a sustainable and environmentally-friendly way. For this reason guidelines have been prepared by the various mountaineering and alpine clubs. These say, for example, that plants may be photographed but not picked.

In addition to these measures the Alpine countries and the EU have agreed a framework programme for pan-Alpine policy. The agreement is also known as the Alpine Convention and, in addition to conservation, also covers planning, sustainable development, mountain farming, countryside conservation, mountain forests, tourism, soil protection, energy and transport.

See also 
 List of sports
 List of climbers and mountaineers
 Glossary of climbing terms

References

Literature 
 Martin Krauß: Der Träger war immer schon vorher da. Die Geschichte des Wanderns und Bergsteigens in den Alpen. Nagel & Kimche, Zürich, 2013,

Sports by type
Mountaineering